Vinodhini is an Indian actress, who has appeared in Tamil, Malayalam and Kannada films and Tamil serials. Beginning her acting career as a child artist, she went on to play lead and supporting roles before acting in television series as well. She was credited as Shwetha in Kannada films.

Career
Vinodhini began her acting career as a child artist, appearing in films including Manal Kayiru, Puthiya Sagaptham and Mannukkul Vairam, before going on to enact lead roles in Tamil films. In 1992, she was directed by Balu Mahendra in Vanna Vanna Pookkal. Although the film was critically as well as commercially successful—it won the National Film Award for Best Feature Film in Tamil and completed a 100-days run in theatres—it failed to propel Vinodhini's career. That year, she debuted in Malayalam cinema with Soorya Manasam and the Kannada film industry with Chaitrada Premanjali, where she took on the stage name Shwetha. Both films were successes. After appearing in several Tamil films, including Balu Mahendra's Marupadiyum, Visu's Pattukottai Periyappa, Rama Narayanan's Vaanga Partner Vaanga, and two K. S. Ravikumar films, Suriyan Chandiran and Muthukulikka Vaariyala, most of them featuring her in secondary characters, she shifted her focus to Kannada films by the mid-1990s, where she continued to play lead roles. Her work in Tamil films in the late 90s was limited to minor supporting roles and guest appearances. Films in she made brief appearances include Praveen Gandhi's action film Ratchagan, Sundar C.'s comedy flick Unakkaga Ellam Unakkaga  and N. Mathrubootham's Puthira Punithama.

Vinodhini soon started acting in television serials, such as the drama series Chithi, Agal Vilakku and Kannadi Kathavugal, and the comedy series Vidathu Sirippu by Crazy Mohan. Besides, she hosted a television show for eight years. She made a return to Tamil films with a supporting role as the female lead's (Meera Jasmine) sister in Kasthuri Maan in 2005. In its review, The Hindu stated that she gave a "very appealing performance" in the film. Since, she has appeared in minor roles in two Karu Pazhaniappan films.

Filmography

Television

References

External links
 
 Vinodhini at CineSouth

Living people
Indian film actresses
Indian television actresses
Indian child actresses
Actresses in Tamil cinema
Actresses in Malayalam cinema
Actresses in Kannada cinema
20th-century Indian actresses
21st-century Indian actresses
Year of birth missing (living people)
Actresses in Tamil television
Actresses in Malayalam television